Frank Denyer (born April 12, 1943 in London) is a composer. His music uses a combination of conventional instruments and new, unusual, and structurally modified instruments.  Partly due to his studies of non-Western music, much of Denyer's music is microtonal.

Biography
Denyer was a chorister at Canterbury Cathedral and later studied at the Guildhall in London. In 1966 he co-founded, and was director of, the Society of Hermes, an arts club for new music, painting, poetry and theatre in Shepherds Bush, London. He formed and directed Mouth of Hermes. a professional instrumental ensemble devoted to new and experimental forms of music. He toured widely with the ensemble in Europe, Scandinavia and the U.K. in the years up to 1974, presenting new compositions. During this time he was Lecturer in Composition and 20th Century Studies at Hornsey College of Art. This early period culminated in his being a featured composer/performer at the Festival d’Orleans, France, in 1973.

Denyer left the UK for a time in 1974 to begin what he calls his "musical travels", and to undertake his first attempts at ethnomusicological fieldwork (in west Asia and the Kulu Valley in north India). In the summer of 1974 he was a Visiting lecturer at the National Institute of Design, Ahmedabad, India. Between 1974 and 1977 he was a PhD student in Ethnomusicology at Wesleyan University in Connecticut. Thereafter he was Research Fellow in African Music at the Institute of African Studies, University of Nairobi, Kenya, and then Lecturer in Ethnomusicology at Kenyatta University College in Nairobi. The impact of these studies on his subsequent musical output is profound, but Denyer has never been interested in hybridization or "crossover". Upon his return to England in 1981 he began teaching at Dartington College of Arts in Devon, where he was a Professor of Composition until the college merged with University College Falmouth in 2010. Together with James Fulkerson co-founded the Barton Workshop in Amsterdam in 1990 to perform American experimental music and his own compositions; his recordings of the solo piano music and ensemble works of Morton Feldman, Galina Ustvolskaya, Christian Wolff, John Cage, Jerry Hunt, James Tenney, Alvin Lucier and others have met with wide acclaim.

Denyer's music has remained resolutely independent of musical fashion. An early interest in melody in the 1970s has remained a feature of his work (as seen perhaps in its most extreme form in his works for shakuhachi, collected on the 2007 CD Music for shakuhachi [see Discography]). His music shows an extraordinary ear for timbre, and for novel combinations of acoustic sounds. The first of his large-scale works, A Monkey's Paw (premiered at Darmstadt in 1990; see Discography) displays this clearly. More recently an interest in extremely quiet sounds has characterised several works, including Prison Song, Faint Traces and Tentative Thoughts, Silenced Voices (collectively forming his Prison Trilogy (1999–2003)).

Compositions for shakuhachi 
Though not a shakuhachi player himself, Denyer has collaborated with Yoshikazu Iwamoto to write pieces for the instrument, including:
 After the Rain
 Wheat
 The Tender Sadness of Tyrants as They Dance
 Stalks
 Winged Play
 Unnamed

Discography 
 Silenced Voices. Mode, 2008 (includes Woman, Viola and Crow; Two Beacons; Ghosts Again; Tentative Thoughts, Silenced Voices )
 Music for Shakuhachi. Another Timbre, 2007 (includes On, on - it must be so; Quite White; Wheat; Unnamed)
 Faint Traces. Mode, 2005 (includes Out of the Shattered Shadows 1; Out of the Shattered Shadows 2; Faint Traces; Music for Two Performers; Play; Passages)
 Fired City. Tzadik, 2002 (includes Towards the Darkness; Beneath the Fired City; Quick, Quick, the Tamberan is Coming; The Hanged Fiddler; Resonances of Ancient Sins; Prison Song)
 Finding Refuge in the Remains. Etcetera, 1998 (includes Finding Refuge in the Remains; Quartet; Frog; Archeology; Contained in a Strange Garden; The Tender Sadness of Tyrants as They Dance)
 The Contrabass Saxophone. Earup, 1996 (includes Resonances of Ancient Sins)
 Konink & Andriessen: Notes 94. Walpurgis, 1994 (includes Beneath the Fired City)
 A Monkey's Paw. Continuum, 1991 (includes Stalks; After the Rain; A Fragile Thread; A Monkey's Paw; Winged Play)
 Wheat: The Music of Frank Denyer. Orchid Records, 1984 (includes On, On, it must be so; I Await the Sea’s Red Hibiscus; Wheat; Quick, Quick, the Tamberan is Coming; Quite White; Voices)

Writings and interviews 
 Interview with Frank Denyer (2007) by Dan Warburton in Paris Transatlantic Magazine
 Denyer, Frank (ed.) & Landy, Leigh (ed.). Leaving the Twentieth Century: Ideas & Visions of New Musics. Harwood Academic Pub., 1997. .
 Denyer, Frank.  Finding a Voice in an Age of Migration (1994) in Contemporary Music Review, 1996, vol. 15, nos 3-4.
 Denyer, Frank.  The Shakuhachi and the Contemporary Music Instrumentarium: a Personal View (1991) in Contemporary Music Review, 1994, vol. 6, no. 2.

External links 
 FrankDenyer.eu
 Frank Denyer at 60: Butterfly effect (article from Musical Times, 2003)

English classical composers
Microtonal composers
Wesleyan University alumni
Tzadik Records artists
1943 births
Living people
English male classical composers
20th-century English composers
20th-century British male musicians